Lost Creek is a  tributary of the Juniata River in central Pennsylvania in the United States.

Lost Creek joins the Juniata River at the community of Cuba Mills in Juniata County.

See also
List of rivers of Pennsylvania

References

Rivers of Pennsylvania
Tributaries of the Juniata River
Rivers of Juniata County, Pennsylvania